The Cottonwood Creek Bridge is a bridge in Fallon County, Montana near the town of Ismay, built in 1934. It was listed on the National Register of Historic Places in 2014. From 1926 to 1941, at least 1,242 timber stringer bridges were built in Montana;  this is one of very few intact surviving bridges.

It was listed as part of a statewide study of timber stringer bridges.

It was built by Emil Prahl and Henry Sawtell, both of Miles City, to the standardized plans provided by the Montana Highway Department, a predecessor agency to the Montana Department of Transportation. Its ends are supported by timber abutments and wingwalls braced with wood pilings. The spans are between four sets of treated timber pile bents made of Douglas fir.

References

National Register of Historic Places in Fallon County, Montana
Bridges completed in 1934
Road bridges on the National Register of Historic Places in Montana
Transportation in Fallon County, Montana
1934 establishments in Montana
Beam bridges in the United States